The Federal Republic of Central America was a sovereign state south of Mexico which existed from 1823 to 1841. Originally known as the United Provinces of Central America, the democratic republic was composed of the territories of the former Captaincy General of Guatemala of New Spain. 

Central America consisted of the present-day southern Mexican state of Chiapas, the countries of Costa Rica, El Salvador, Guatemala, Honduras, and Nicaragua, as well as parts of Belize. In the 1830s, a sixth state was added—Los Altos, with its capital in Quetzaltenango; it occupied parts of what are now Chiapas and the western highlands of Guatemala.

Shortly after Central America declared independence from the Spanish Empire in 1821, some of its countries were annexed by the First Mexican Empire in 1822 and then Central America formed the federal republic in 1823. From 1838 to 1840, the federation descended into civil war, with conservatives fighting against liberals, and separatists fighting to secede. These factions were unable to overcome their ideological differences and the federation was dissolved after a series of bloody conflicts.

History

Independence 1821–1822
From the 16th century through 1821, Central America, apart from Panama, formed the Captaincy General of Guatemala within the Spanish Empire. In 1821 a congress of Central American Criollos in Guatemala City composed the Act of Independence of Central America to declare the region's independence from Spain, effective on September 15 of that year. The process was bloodless with no resistance from the Spanish authorities as the Governor General Brigadier Gabino Gaínza, along with all the royal governors of the five provinces, were retained in office as executive powers pending a full transition to local rule. That date is still marked as independence day by most Central American nations.

Absorption into the Empire of Mexico, 1822–1823 

Independence proved short-lived, as local law and order broke down. Driven by regional rivalries, many localities refused to accept the newly formed federal powers in Guatemala—San Salvador, Comayagua, León, and Cartago were in open revolt. On January 5, 1822, the Consultive Junta in Guatemala City voted for annexation. A few weeks later Brigadier Vicente Filísola, the envoy of Emperor Agustín de Iturbide of the First Mexican Empire, arrived in Guatemala as the new ruler.

The annexation was controversial, with some seeing the Mexican constitution with its abolition of slavery and establishment of free trade as an improvement over the status quo. Central American liberals in San Salvador objected to annexation and refused to accept Filísola's authority as captain general. The Mexican army was ordered by Emperor Agustín I to quell dissent.

In the case of Costa Rica, the country decided not to join the Mexican Empire as part of the resolutions upon conclusion of the Ochomogo War (April 5, 1823), where imperialists lost against Republicans in the first civil war of Costa Rica.

After Iturbide abdicated (March 19, 1823), Mexico became a republic (formally proclaimed on November 1, 1823) and offered the previously annexed Central American provinces the right to determine their own destiny. Filísola turned over his power to the hastily formed National Constituent Assembly, which comprised representatives from each of the five provinces. On July 1, 1823, the Congress of Central America declared absolute independence from Spain, Mexico, and any other foreign nation, and established a republican system of government.

Reconstitution of the Federal Republic 1823–1840
The liberal-dominated Assembly elected Manuel José Arce as president but he soon turned against his own faction and dissolved the Assembly. San Salvador rose in revolt against federal authority. Honduras and Nicaragua joined the rebellion and Arce was deposed in 1829. The victors led by the Honduran Francisco Morazán took power and Morazán was proclaimed president in 1830. To appease liberal supporters, the capital was relocated from Guatemala City to San Salvador in 1831 but as Morazán's hold on power was waning the opposition regained control in the provinces.

The Assembly in 1838 adjourned with the declaration that the provinces were free to rule themselves as the Federal Republic dissolved. In 1839 Morazán was exiled as rebels from Guatemala, Honduras and Nicaragua entered San Salvador, evicting the governing institutions that held the region together.

Dissolution of the union 
In practice, the Federation faced insurmountable problems, and the union slid into civil war between 1838 and 1840. Its disintegration began when Nicaragua separated from the federation on November 5, 1838, followed by Honduras and Costa Rica (other sources give Nicaragua's secession date as April 30). Because of the chaotic nature of this period an exact date of disestablishment does not exist, but on May 31, 1838, the Congress met to declare that the provinces were free to create their own independent republics. In reality, this merely legally acknowledged the process of disintegration that had already begun. The union effectively ended in 1840, by which time four of its five states had declared independence. The official end came only when El Salvador declared itself an independent republic in February 1841.

Name and emblems 

The flag shows a white band between two blue stripes, representing the land between two oceans. The coat of arms shows five mountains (one for each state) between two oceans, surmounted by a Phrygian cap, the emblem of the French Revolution. The flag was introduced to the area by Commodore Louis-Michel Aury and inspired by the Argentine flag. The nation also adopted the term "united provinces", used in Argentina's original name,  ("United Provinces of the River Plate").

Successor flags 
Today, all five successor nations' flags retain the old federal motif of two outer blue bands bounding an inner white stripe. (Costa Rica modified its flag significantly in 1848, darkening the blue and adding a double-wide inner red band.) The short-lived sixth state of Los Altos was reannexed by Guatemala.

Later Central American federal unions 
Despite the failure of a lasting political union, the sense of shared history and the hope for eventual reunification persist in the nations formerly in the union. Various attempts were made to reunite Central America in the nineteenth and early twentieth centuries, but none succeeded for any length of time:
 The first attempt was in 1844 by former President Francisco Morazán, who became involved in a struggle for control over Costa Rica. After taking control of the capital, Morazán announced he would create a large army to re-create the Federal Republic as the Confederation of Central America and planned to include El Salvador, Guatemala, Honduras, and Nicaragua, but popular feeling rapidly turned against him and a sudden revolt resulted in his arrest and execution by firing squad on September 15 of that year.
 A second attempt was made in October 1852 when El Salvador, Honduras and Nicaragua created a Federation of Central America. The union lasted less than a month.
 In 1856–1857 the region successfully established a military coalition to repel an invasion by the U.S. freebooter William Walker.
 Guatemalan President General Justo Rufino Barrios attempted to reunite the nation by force of arms in the 1880s but he died in battle near the town of Chalchuapa, El Salvador.
 A third union of Honduras, Nicaragua, and El Salvador as the Greater Republic of Central America lasted from 1896 to 1898.
 The latest attempt occurred between June 1921 and January 1922, when El Salvador, Guatemala, Honduras and Costa Rica formed a (second) Federation of Central America. The treaty establishing this federation was signed at San José, Costa Rica, on January 19, 1921. The treaty stipulated for the future creation of one state of all the four signatories, under one constitution. This second federation was nearly moribund from the start, having only a Provisional Federal Council of delegates from each state.
 In 1991 an economic and political organization called the Central American Integration System was formed with all Central American countries as well as the Dominican Republic. In addition to the historic backdrop in Central America, advocates of this latest integration effort regularly cite the European Union as a model to emulate.

See also 
Gran Colombia – another short-lived post-Spanish federal state
Peru–Bolivian Confederation – another short-lived post-Spanish federal state
Golden Circle (proposed country) – a proposed Caribbean federation
Union of South American Nations, an organization
Central American Integration System
Central America-4 Border Control Agreement

References

Further reading

External links
Constitutions from several attempts at Central American unification 
Central America: Historical Unions and Federations
Flags & chronology of Guatemala
Map of the FRCA
Maps showing the collapse of the Central American Republic

 
Former countries in Central America
Former republics
History of Central America
History of Costa Rica
History of El Salvador
History of Guatemala
History of Honduras
History of Nicaragua
19th century in Central America
19th century in Costa Rica
19th century in El Salvador
19th century in Guatemala
19th century in Honduras
19th century in Nicaragua
States and territories established in 1823
States and territories disestablished in 1841
1823 establishments in North America
1841 disestablishments in North America
1823 establishments in Central America
1841 disestablishments in Central America
Costa Rica–El Salvador relations
Costa Rica–Guatemala relations
Costa Rica–Honduras relations
Costa Rica–Nicaragua relations
El Salvador–Guatemala relations
El Salvador–Honduras relations
El Salvador–Nicaragua relations
Guatemala–Honduras relations
Guatemala–Nicaragua relations
Honduras–Nicaragua relations
Pan-Americanism